The infrahyoid muscles, or strap muscles, are a group of four pairs of muscles in the anterior (frontal) part of the neck. The four infrahyoid muscles are the sternohyoid, sternothyroid, thyrohyoid and omohyoid muscles.

Excluding the sternothyroid, the infrahyoid muscles either originate from or insert on to the hyoid bone.

The term infrahyoid refers to the region below the hyoid bone, while the term strap muscles refers to the long and flat muscle shapes which resembles a strap. The stylopharyngeus muscle is considered by many to be one of the strap muscles, but is not an infrahyoid muscle.

Individual muscles
The origin, insertion and innervation of the individual muscles:

Nerve supply
All of the infrahyoid muscles are innervated by the ansa cervicalis from the cervical plexus (C1-C3) except the thyrohyoid muscle, which is innervated by fibers only from the first cervical spinal nerve travelling with the hypoglossal nerve.

Function
The infrahyoid muscles function to elevate and depress the hyoid bone and larynx during swallowing and speech. This moves the larynx as one unit.

See also
 Muscular triangle
 Suprahyoid muscles

References

Muscles of the head and neck